Gildo is a masculine given name and nickname that is borne by:

Given name
 Gildo (died 398), ancient Roman Berber general
 Gildo Bocci (1886–1964), Italian film actor
 Gildo Cunha do Nascimento (died 2019), Brazilian footballer known as Gildo
 Gildo Insfrán (born 1951), Argentine politician and governor of Formosa Province
 Gildo Kassa (born 1995), Ethiopian record producer, songwriter and singer
 Gildo Pastor (1910–1990), Monégasque businessman and property developer
 Gildo Pallanca Pastor (born 1967), Monegasque businessman, grandson of the above
 Gildo Rizzato (born 1948), Italian former footballer
 Gildo Rodrigues (1939–2009), Brazilian footballer manager
 Gildo Seisdedos Domínguez (born 1967), Spanish economist and lawyer
 Gildo Siorpaes (born 1938), Italian bobsledder
 Gildo Vilanculos (born 1995), Mozambican footballer

Nickname
 Ermenegildo Gildo Arena (1921–2005), Italian water polo player and freestyle swimmer
 Hermenengildo Gildo Mahones (1929–2018), American jazz pianist
 Ermenegildo Zegna (fashion entrepreneur) (born 1955), Italian entrepreneur

Masculine given names
Hypocorisms
Lists of people by nickname